Konstantinos Piladakis  (Greek: Κωνσταντίνος Πηλαδάκης; born 17 August 1966 in Athens) is a Greek Businessman.

Life and career

He was born in Athens on 17 August 1966 and by the summer of 2004, has been the owner and chairman of AEL 1964 FC. He dealt with sports as a basketball player, while in the same sport he made also his first steps as an administrative (Piraikos, Ilysiakos). His entanglement with football began in 2001 with Ilisiakos. He achieved a double promotion from Delta Ethniki to Football League, the second national division of Greek football before taking the reins of AEL from 2004 to 2013.
On his days the "Queen of Thessaly"  returned in the Greek Superleague in 2005, achieved a European participation in the UEFA Intertoto Cup in 2006, lifted the 2007 Greek Cup for the second time in the club's history after 22 years and played in the 2007–08 UEFA Cup, reaching the group stage by eliminating English club Blackburn Rovers. The team also made it to the Play Offs of Greek Superleague in the season 2008–09, taking a ticket for the qualifying phase of the first Europa League.
He is one of the founding members of the Greek Superleague cooperative and vice president at 2007, while from the summer of 2008 until the summer of 2009, he has been the 3rd chairman in the history of the association.

Except football – his enterprising activities are including also the following :

 Chairman and Directing Adviser of VIVERE ENTERTAINMENT ΕΜΠΟΡΙΚΗ & ΣΥΜΜΕΤΟΧΩΝ Α.Ε.(VIRGIN MEGASTORES and CAZINO XANTHI)
 Chairman D.S., Directing Adviser and basic shareholder of CASINO HOTEL Rio – Achaia
 Chairman of company COSMO – ΜΕΓΑΛΑ Α.Ε.Ε. (cooperative with Cosmote Mobile Telecommunications Α.Ε.)
 Chairman and Directing Adviser of music recording company V2 RECORDS HELLAS

Also, he is the founder of air company VIRGIN ATLANTIC (Greece, 1992 – 2002) and has been directing adviser until 1999, while he was rewarded by the former Secretary-General of United Nations, Boutros Boutros-Ghali, at the event of awards Leaders of the Year 2003, as the best new Greek businessman of the year.

External links
 AEL 1964 Official (In Greek)
 interview (In Greek)
 Crimson Scorer (In Greek)
 Profile at Onsports (In Greek)
 gossip-tv.gr (In Greek)
 Doretta Papadimitriou interview (In Greek)

1966 births
Living people
Businesspeople from Athens
Greek football chairmen and investors
Athlitiki Enosi Larissa F.C.